Peter Sarbach was born in St. Niklaus, Switzerland, near the village of Zermatt; which is a historic village in the Shadow of the Matterhorn, the great mountain which divides the watershed from Switzerland and Italy.

Prominence
In 1864, Peter Sarbach was a porter for Sir Edward Whymper in one of his attempts to ascend the Matterhorn.  Subsequently, he became a guide in the Swiss Alps and surrounding area.  The competent guiding skills of Peter Sarbach were well renowned.  At age 53, he was invited to Canada for an 1897 first ascent expedition of Mt. Lefroy; and hence he became the first Swiss guide to work in the Canadian Rockies.

Canadian accomplishment
The guiding skills of Peter Sarbach were commissioned, in a roundabout way, at the request of Edwin Hale Abbot, the father of Philip Stanley Abbot.  Hence, together with John Norman Collie, Professor Harold Baily Dixon, George Percival Baker, Professor Charles Ernest Fay, and others, Peter Sarbach lead a memorial first ascent of Mt. Lefroy on Aug. 3, 1897; exactly one year after the tragic death of Philip Stanley Abbot.  See Abbot Pass hut.  Peter Sarbach further guided 1897 expeditions to a first ascent of Victoria Mountain, Mt. Gordon, and Mt. Sarbach (Mt. Sarbach named on his behalf).

Historic significance
Peter Sarbach returned to his home in Switzerland in the fall of 1897, and never returned to Canada; so his prominence faded somewhat.  However, the impression he left, from his 1897 expeditions, would set the pace for Swiss Mountaineering influence in Canada.  His exploits confirmed the need for competent Mountaineering, and influenced the 1898 invitations to Swiss guides Edouard (Edward) Feuz Sr. and Christian Haesler Sr.

References

1844 births
1930 deaths
Swiss mountain climbers
People from Visp (district)
Sportspeople from Valais